Mamtaz Begum is a Bangladesh Nationalist Party politician and the former Member of Parliament of Chittagong-13.

Career
Begum was elected to parliament from Chittagong-13 as a Bangladesh Nationalist Party candidate in 1996 by-election. The By-elections were called after Oli Ahmed, who was elected from two constituencies, resigned and choose to represent Chittagong-14.

References

Bangladesh Nationalist Party politicians
Women members of the Jatiya Sangsad
Living people
7th Jatiya Sangsad members
Year of birth missing (living people)
20th-century Bangladeshi women politicians